The Spiegelkogel is a mountain in the Schnalskamm group of the Ötztal Alps.

Climbing route
You do not need any special equipment to climb it, but there are exposed sections on the summit ridge. The approach from Vent was taken by the first ascendants but is now uncommon. The approach from Obergurgl is via the  mountain hostel at 3006 m altitude. Plan 5 hours from the village to the summit and 3 hours from the hut.

External links 
 Spiegelkogel in Mountains for Everybody.

Mountains of Tyrol (state)
Mountains of the Alps
Alpine three-thousanders
Ötztal Alps